Neoconservatism in the United States is an ideological political movement.

The term "Neoconservativism" may  refer to:
Usage influenced by the US movement:
 In the Czech Republic, see Neoconservatism in the Czech Republic
 In the United Kingdom, see British neoconservatism
Other meanings:
 In Germany, German neo-conservative movement
 In China, New Conservatism (China)
 In Japan, see Neoconservatism in Japan

See also
Neoliberalism